Meital Dohan is an Israeli actress and musician. As an actress, she began her career on Israeli television, appearing on Dancing with the Stars, Esti HaMekho'eret (Ugly Betty), and in Romeo and Juliet. Her work on US-television began when she appeared as Yael Hoffman on the Showtime series Weeds. She went on to have roles in The Sopranos and as Aurora in the Sony Pictures web-comedy Woke Up Dead. Dohan has starred in the film Foreclosure and in the thriller Monogamy, which won the Best Narrative Feature at the Tribeca Film Festival. Her roles in TV and film have led to two including two Israeli Oscar nominations and an Israeli Tony Award.

Dohan became involved in music from 2012 onwards, when she started to work with hip-hop producer, Che Pope. She and Pope recorded her debut album, I'm in Hate With Love. Dohan then received international recognition for her first single "Yummy" and its viral video, which trended at No. 1 on ReverbNation. The single "On Ya" with Sean Kingston charted No. 5 on the UK Club Pop Charts and No. 31 on the Billboard Club Chart. The tracks were remixed by numerous DJs including R3hab and Sidney Samson.

Early life
In 1994 Dohan joined the Israel Defense Forces and served in the I.D.F theater, later studying at Nissan Nativ acting school. During her studies, she received scholarships from the America Israel Cultural Foundation. In her first year of studies, she wrote, directed, and acted in an original theatre movement production. During the second year of studies, she began working in a variety of television productions and performed in two feature films in her third year. Before graduating, Dohan had signed a contract with Israel's Cameri Theater.

Career

Acting in Israel & move to United States (1998-2005)
Dohan graduated from the Tel Aviv-based acting school Nissan Nativ in 1998. After graduating, Dohan held numerous acting roles at two major theatres in Israel. This began with the Cameri Theater, before also acting at the Haifa Theatre. While at the Cameri Theater, she played several roles which kickstarted her career. She starred in the role of Juliet in Romeo and Juliet at the theatre, but most notably won an Israeli Theater Award in 2000, the equivalent of a Tony, for her role in "Best Friends." The Theatrical award was in the 'Most Promising New Actress' category. A couple of years later, Israeli playwright Edna Mazia wrote a part into her play "Bad Children" specifically for Dohan. The role performance in Bad Children lead to another Best Actress award at the Israeli Tony's.

After working in theatre for 2 years, Dohan secured her first major film role in the Hebrew-language film, Giraffes, which was released in 2001. Prior to the release of Giraffes, Dohan also had roles in The Legend of the Silent Man in 1998 and Instructions Not Included in 1999. Dohan played the role of Efrat in the 2001 film, one of three women who cross paths after a dramatic evening means they cross paths. Her role in Giraffes led to her first Israeli Oscar nomination, known as a Ophir Award, in 2002. For her role in Giraffes she studied French. The film also later won at the 2003 Scottsdale Arizona Film Festival. Her next film was God's Sandbox, where a successful author looks for her daughter in the Sinai desert. The film went onto win at the 2002 Manchester film festival.

Dohan returned to theater in 2003, where she sang and acted in Moving Flesh at the Cameri Theater. She also began directing at the Tmu-na Theater and co-wrote the original Revue Love Sex on the High Holidays, along with Israeli singer Ivri Lider. Aside from theater work, Dohan secured a major TV role, in the Israeli-Version of Ugly Betty. She played the central comedic role of Nataly. The series was a big hit in Israel, winning a number of awards. It won the Israeli Oscar Best Comedy Series award in 2003, and Dohan won an Israeli Tony Award for her work in the series for her lead role. Later in the same year, Dohan co-wrote a movie script, Orgy by Heart, along with Maayan Keret.

In 2003, Dohan secured her first role in the United States. She was invited by Karen Shefler to play the role of the Blood Wedding by Lorca. Dohan then announced she was working on the one-woman comedy show, Bath Party. It was created by Dohan along with Karen Shefler and Ayelet Dekel and it was performed Off-Broadway at the HERE Arts Center. The theatrical performance was Dohan's big break in US-theatre, receiving positive reviews from New York-based media, including the New York Times. Village Voice praised Dohan's work in the play, writing "What saves the piece from being a purely wandering, aimless morass is the droll humor and keen comedic timing of Dohan and her associates. Dohan has a sharp wit and notable ability to find the unlikely joke". In 2004, she starred in the feature film To Dance. In speaking toward her work with her co-stars, they wrote "Their quick banter and easy back-and-forth are polished and at times charming, and together they make even the most disjointed material a pleasure to watch". The New York Times also spoke well of Bath Party, comparing Dohan to "a younger, prettier, blonder Rosanna Arquette", noting it as an essentially a one-woman show which "focuses on her not particularly interesting efforts to jump-start an American career, complete with film and television clips, circumlocutory monologues and, perhaps most important for this particular performer, multiple opportunities to reveal her appealing anatomy", and also praising the work of the few others in the cast. Later, Dohan co-wrote Love and Sex on the High Holidays with Israeli singer Ivri Lide.

Major US roles & music (2006-present)
In 2006 came Dohan's biggest break in the United States to date. After the first season of the television show Weeds, Dohan secured the role as Yael Hoffman, an Admission director of Ha Midrash L’Torah, the rabbinical school that main character Andy Botwin attended. She appeared in every episode of season 2.

In 2008, she appeared in both the Off-Broadway and Los Angeles productions of the play Stitching by controversial British playwright Anthony Neilson and directed by Timothy Haskell, an example of "in-yer-face" theater. The play seeks to confront the audience with shocking and sometimes vulgar depictions of human behavior. The Forward said Dohan "Shines on the New York Stage". Of Dohan's work in the Neilson play, The New York Times wrote "With an actress as extremely gorgeous as Meital Dohan and a script that requires her to thrash around in ways most often seen in straight-to-video steamers, you would think that Stitching would be heating up the Wild Project theater to the boiling point." They found that it did not, blaming the Neilson script for working "so hard at being gimmicky that it doesn't give Ms. Dohan and her co-star, Gian Murray Gianino, a chance to find real chemistry. No chemistry, no combustion."  They granted that the two leads "give energetic, bruise-inducing performances under Timothy Haskell's direction", but that the script's manner of ricocheting "from comedy to pathos to psychosis without ever really providing the starting point that any play needs" placed too many demands on them.

In 2009, she appeared in two episodes of the online series Woke Up Dead. The series follows a young man who wakes up in a bath tub and has no heartbeat, making friends believe he became a zombie. Dohan plays the character Aurora in the online series, which received positive reviews, including one from the Los Angeles Times. In 2010, Dohan became the official Spokesperson for "Artists 4 Israel" and their mural project "Paint Israel". Paint Israel aimed to paint the bomb shelters in Sderot and show that America's young, graffiti community supports the people of Israel.

Dohan returned to theatre in January 2011, headlining the Alan Bowne stage play Beirut in a limited revival directed by Andrew and Zach Zoppa in New York City. Later in the year, Dohan starred in the dramatic thriller Monogamy directed and written by Academy Award nominee Dana Adam Shapiro. The film centers on the strained relationship of a Brooklyn couple, Theo (Chris Messina) and Nat (Rashida Jones). The film won "Best Narrative" at the Tribeca Film Festival.

Dohan has authored the book Love and Other Bad Habits, and in January 2011, she launched the webcast talk radio show, Loud Miracles which airs on Women's Radio. On her show Dohan declared "I am fascinated by Transcendental Meditation and the effects of it. I was so taken by this technique that now we are talking about bringing more awareness to it and bringing it to people that serve in the Israeli Army."

Six years after originally starring in Weeds, it was announced that Dohan would be returning for the 100th episode in 2012.

In 2016, she joined the cast on Cabaret Maxime, starring as herself.

Music
In 2011, Dohan announced the production of her solo album I'm in Hate with Love. Dohan began working with producers Rami Afuni of LMFAO and Che Pope, who was best known for his work with Dr. Dre, Eminem and Lauryn Hill. In October 2011, Dohan debuted "Yummy Boyz", a viral video that was featured on pop sites including Popdust.com, which called the tune catchy, upbeat and exuding the same sexiness and playfulness that the actress turned singer represented. In February 2012, Meital debuted her hit single, "Yummy" produced by Afuni, on iTunes, MTVu, MTV Buzzworthy, MTV LOGO and MTV Networks. Following the success of her video "Yummy Boyz" and her debut single "Yummy", Meital released the track "On Ya" featuring Sean Kingston, which PopCrush called a "club banger". The single hit No. 31 on the Billboard Dance Chart and No. 5 on the UK's Pop Chart, even before it was officially released.

In addition, the song started playing on radio stations including KIIS-FM. "Yummy Boyz" received rave reviews by entertainment sites across the world, quickly solidifying her as a new gay icon and one of the Top 5 Artists to Watch according to PRIDE Radio and Dinah Shore. "Yummy" has also been the most spun single on PRIDE Radio, one of iHeartRadio.com's most popular channels and reached No. 49 on the Billboard dance chart.
Due to the success of "Yummy", the singer performed at the Winter Music Conference, White Party, and The Dinah, who named Dohan one of the five emerging artists to watch in 2012. In addition, she presented at the 2012 International Dance Music Awards.

In June 2012, Interview premiered Dohan's second single "On Ya" featuring rapper-singer-songwriter Sean Kingston. Dohan officially released the single on 6 June 2012. Dohan also released an official video for "On Ya" on 14 October 2012, which included Sean Kingston and which garnered over three million views over one month. The video was directed by Ray Kay, who is known for his work on music videos for Justin Bieber "Baby", Britney Spears "Til The World Ends", and Lady Gaga "Pokerface".

Partial filmography

Television
 Puzzle (1 episode, 1999)
 Shemesh (1 episode, 2000) as Sarit
 Lochamey HaMasach (2002)
 Shaul (1 episode, 2002)
 My First Sony (2002)
 Esti HaMekho'eret (2003–2004) as Natalie Bushari-Mark
 Elvis, Rosental VeHaIsha HaMistorit (2005) as Natalie Bushari-Mark
 Elvis (2006) as Natalie Bushari-Mark
 The Sopranos (1 episode, 2006) as Yael
 Weeds (7 episodes, 2006) as Yael Hoffman
 Lo Hivtachti Lach (2006)
 Pa'am BaChayim (2007)
 Woke Up Dead (9 episodes, 2009) as Aurora
 Weeds (2012) as Yael Hoffman

Film
 Agadat HaIsh SheShatak (The Legend of the Silent Man) (1998)
 Bli Daf Hora'ot (Instructions Not Included) (1999)
 Girafot (2001) as Efrat
 Disphoria (2004) as Danielle
 Shark Tale (2004) as Angie (Hebrew Dub)
 Tahara (God's Sandbox) (2004)
 If Only He'd Call (2006)
 Lirkod (The Belly Dancer) (2006) as Deby
 Failing Better Now (2010)
 Monogamy (2010) as. Subgirl
 Foreclosure (2011)
 Ponies (2010) (in production) as Aliah

Recognition
Of Dohan's work in the film Monogamy, The Los Angeles Times stated, "Meital Dohan has no lines in the indie thriller, but her sexy, mysterious presence helps propel the film ...."  It notes that even though the character has no lines in the film, she receives top billing.

Awards and nominations
 2002, nominated for Israeli Academy Award Nominee for 'Best Actress' for her role in Giraffes,
 2003, nominated for Israeli Academy Award Nominee for 'Best Actress' for her role in God's Sandbox
 Won Israeli Tony Award for her work in Cameri Theater and for her lead role in the Israeli Emmy winning series Ugliest Esti
Israeli Theater Award (Israel equivalent Tony Awards 2000) for Most Promising Actress for her role as Sofi in Best Girlfriend
Cameri Theater Scholarship for Deserving Young Actress, 1999
American Israel Foundation Scholarship 1996, 1997

References

External links

 
 

Israeli film actresses
Israeli stage actresses
Israeli television actresses
Living people
People from Ra'anana
Jewish Israeli musicians
Jewish Israeli actresses
Israeli pop singers
English-language singers from Israel
21st-century Israeli women singers
Survivor (Israeli TV series) contestants
1976 births